Pintu Mahata (born 3 June 1997) is an Indian professional footballer who plays as a winger for Rajasthan United in the I-League.

Career
A youth product for Mohun Bagan, Mahato was included in the club's first-team after injuries to regular starting players Subhasish Bose and Raynier Fernandes. He made his professional debut for the club on 1 April 2017 against Bengaluru FC. He came on as an 89th-minute substitute for Souvik Chakraborty as Mohun Bagan won 3–0.
On 3 September 2018, derby debutant Mahato scored his maiden goal against East Bengal and also became the man of the match. On 18 October, against Mohammedan Sporting, Pintu scored an 89th Minute winner and also became the Man of the Match.

Rajasthan United
In July 2022, I-League outfit Rajasthan United completed the permanent signing of Mahata on a two-year deal.

Career statistics

Club

Honours

Club
Mohun Bagan
Calcutta Football League (1): 2018–19

References

Living people
Indian footballers
Mohun Bagan AC players
Association football forwards
I-League players
1997 births
Footballers from West Bengal
East Bengal Club players
Sudeva Delhi FC players
Rajasthan United FC players